The Hobart City Football Club (trading name: Hobart City Demons) was an Australian rules football club which competed in the Tasmanian State Football League (TSL) from 2014–17 and were based in Hobart, Tasmania.

History
Hobart City was established as a football club in December 2013, in preparation for entrance in the Tasmanian State League for the 2014 season. The club was formed to provide a pathway for the junior clubs within the CBD boundaries. Ex North Hobart Football Club President Bruce Free accepted a 50% ownership with the Hobart Football Club, however Hobart withdrew and AFL Tasmania took the other 50% ownership. The North Hobart Football Club has since obtained 100% ownership. The most significant change is the North Hobart Football Club will change from an incorporated body and become a company limited by guarantee with a new constitution and board structure.

North Hobart's 2013 captain Hugh Williams was given the captaincy for Hobart City and former North Hobart assistant coach Michael McGregor was announced as the inaugural coach. The team has an overall playing list of over 60 players, ensuring representation in the State and Development leagues. Unlike other clubs in Australian rules football, Hobart City FC elected not to adopt a nickname upon inception. It was not until July 2014, halfway through its first season, that the club announced it would be known as the "Hobart City Demons" as their trading name.

On October 9, 2017 the paying members of the Hobart City Demons voted 371-118 (76%-24%) in favour of returning the playing name of the club to the traditional North Hobart identity for season 2018 and beyond.

Guernsey
The club guernsey was modelled on the Melbourne Football Club away strip, featuring the v-shape design in the colours of predominantly white, red and blue.

Home ground
The club played nearly all its home games at the North Hobart Oval. The Queenborough Oval in the Hobart suburb of Sandy Bay occasionally hosted one game a season.

Club results

References

Australian rules football clubs in Tasmania
Tasmanian Football League clubs
Sport in Hobart